Mahmoud Awad Sress Al-Hasini (born 15 February 1967) is a Jordanian long-distance runner. He competed in the men's 5000 metres at the 1992 Summer Olympics.

References

1967 births
Living people
Athletes (track and field) at the 1992 Summer Olympics
Jordanian male long-distance runners
Olympic athletes of Jordan
Place of birth missing (living people)
Athletes (track and field) at the 1994 Asian Games
Asian Games competitors for Jordan
20th-century Jordanian people